Kolkwitz (Lower Sorbian Gołkojce) is a municipality in the district of Spree-Neiße, in Lower Lusatia, Brandenburg, Germany.

Geography
Kolkwitz is situated 5 km west of Cottbus. location

This central position makes Kolkwitz a good base for day trips to
Berlin
Dresden
the Spreewald (Lübbenau, Lübben or Burg)
the "Park of Branitz" (in Cottbus) and Park von Muskau created by famous landscape-gardener Hermann von Pückler-Muskau.
"Lutherstadt“ Wittenberg – former hometown of Martin Luther.
Tropical Islands Resort near Lübben
Poland

History
First documentation concerning Kolkwitz is based in the 13th century. From 1815 to 1947, Kolkwitz was part of the Prussian Province of Brandenburg. From 1952 to 1990, it was part of the Bezirk Cottbus of East Germany.

Demography

Tourism
Pictures from Kolkwitz can be found  here.
Clicking the pictures gives you further information ( German only).

There's a bunker of former airforce of German Democratic Republic (GS-31), which can be visited.  website

Hotels and restaurants are listed   here.

Clubs

Biggest sportsclub in Kolkwitz is the    SV Kolkwitz 1896 e.V. .

Kolkwitzer Carneval Club e. V. (KCC) is known to be one of the most active Carneval Clubs in the region. On 12 December 2019, the Kolkwitzer Carneval Club e.V. was rewarded with a donation of 500 euros for its outstanding club activities by a local energy supplier.

Motorsportclub Hänchen arranges German Open Masterships in Motocross (motorbikes) every year.

Firebrigades (German: „Feuerwehren“) in the different towns of the municipality are a very popular.

More clubs can be found    here.

Towns of the municipality
The municipality Kolkwitz exists since the year 1993. It includes the following towns:

Partnership
There are partnerships between Kolkwitz and the towns following:

Großmehring in the Bavarian district Eichstätt (Germany). Partnership established on June 18 and September 24 in 1994. 
Torzym in the Lubusz Voivodeship (Poland). Partnership established on June 10, 2006.

References

External links

Kolkwitz municipality
Bunker-Museum Kolkwitz (GS-31)

Populated places in Spree-Neiße